Mihály Zsupánek (7 March 1830 – 19 January 1905 or 24 January 1898) was a Slovene poet in Hungary, the father of János Zsupánek and grandfather of Vilmoš Županek.

Born in Šalovci (Prekmurje), his parents were Péter Zsupanek and Judit Tolvay. He fought in the Second Italian War of Independence and he participated in the battle of Solferino. In Carniola he learned standard Slovene hymns.

In Dolenci he was an assistant cantor and preserved an old Prekmurje dialect hymnal, as Ferenc Sbüll the poet replaced the old hymns. Some hymns are from the Old Hymnal of Martjanci.

Zsupánek also wrote Hungarian hymns.

Works 
 Peszmaricza (1865)
 Nedelne peszmi (1867)
 Énekeskönyv (ca. 1865)
 Military hymns
 Csudálatos kép
 Litanije Szrcza Jezus
 Mrtvecsne peszmi (ca. 1875)
 Poszlüsajte krscseniczi

See also 
 List of Slovene writers and poets in Hungary

1830 births
Year of death uncertain
Slovenian writers and poets in Hungary
People from Šalovci